Russula vesca, known by the common names of bare-toothed Russula or the flirt, is a basidiomycete mushroom of the genus Russula.

Taxonomy 
Russula vesca was described, and named by the eminent Swedish mycologist Elias Magnus Fries (1794–1878). The specific epithet is the feminine of the Latin adjective vescus, meaning "edible".

Description 
The skin of the cap typically does not reach the margins (resulting in the common names). The cap is 5–10 cm wide, flat, convex, or with slightly depressed centre, weakly sticky, colour brownish to dark brick-red. Taste mild. Gills close apart, white. The stipe narrows toward the base, 2–7 cm long, 1.5–2.5 cm wide, white. It turns deep salmon when rubbed with iron salts (Ferrous sulfate). The spore print is white.

Distribution and habitat 
Russula vesca appears in summer or autumn, and grows primarily in deciduous forests in Europe, and North America.

Edibility 
Russula vesca is considered edible and good, with a mild nutty flavour. In some countries, including Russia, Ukraine and Finland it is considered entirely edible even in the raw state.

See also 
List of Russula species

References 

 "Danske storsvampe.  Basidiesvampe" [a key to Danish basidiomycetes] J.H. Petersen and J. Vesterholt eds. Gyldendal. Viborg, Denmark, 1990.

External links

vesca
Fungi described in 1836
Fungi of Europe
Fungi of North America
Edible fungi